Daybrook railway station was a railway station in Daybrook, Nottinghamshire. It was opened by the Great Northern Railway on its Derbyshire and Staffordshire Extension in 1875–6 and closed in 1960. The station also served the nearby town of Arnold.

History

It was on the descent from Arno Vale towards Leen Valley Junction where the line from
Annesley joined.

Stationmasters
Charles Frederick Pulford ca. 1877 - 1907 
Thomas Peacock 1907 - 1928 
J.F. House 1928 - 1929 
F.M. Wright 1930 - 1936 (afterwards stationmaster at Peterborough)
Joseph George Watts 1936? - 1944 (afterwards acting stationmaster at Kimberley)
W.H. Arrand 1945 - ca. 1950 - ???? (formerly stationmaster at Arksey, Yorkshire)

Present day
The site is now occupied by retail and a section of trackbed is now a footpath.

References

Disused railway stations in Nottinghamshire
Railway stations in Great Britain opened in 1876
Railway stations in Great Britain closed in 1960
Former Great Northern Railway stations